Joanna Chmielewska was the pen name of Irena Kühn née Becker (2 April 1932 – 7 October 2013),  a Polish novelist and screenwriter. Her work is often described as "ironic detective stories". Her novels, which have been translated into at least nine languages, have sold more than 6 million copies in Poland and over 10 million copies in Russia.

Biography
Born in Warsaw in 1932, Chmielewska graduated as an architect in 1954 from Warsaw University of Technology, and worked as a designer before devoting herself to writing. Her first short story was published in the popular magazine Kultura i Życie (Culture and Life) in 1958 and her first novel, Klin (The Wedge), in 1964. She loved horse races and gambling: both hobbies are mentioned extensively in her books. She was also a connoisseur of amber, a passion which forms the basis for her 1998 novel Złota mucha (The Golden Fly).

She wrote more than fifty novels. Most frequently, the protagonist is a woman called Joanna that inherits many characteristics from Chmielewska herself. She also often wrote about Joanna's friends like Alicja (We Are All Suspects, All in Red), co-workers (We Are All Suspects, Wild Protein) or family (The Forefathers' Wells, Bad Luck).

She died on 7 October 2013.

Books 
As of September 2008, there are no published English language translations of Chmielewska's work, and so the exact translation of the Polish titles into English can vary from source to source.

Crime fiction

1964 Klin (The Wedge) (In-context translation of the idiom: "Hair of the dog")
adapted into the feature film Lekarstwo na miłość (1966), directed by Jan Batory, starring Andrzej Łapicki and Kalina Jędrusik
1966 Wszyscy jesteśmy podejrzani (We Are All Suspects)
1969 Krokodyl z Kraju Karoliny (The Crocodile from Caroline's Country)
1972 Całe zdanie nieboszczyka (Dead Man's Tale)
adapted into the Russian television series Что сказал покойник (Chto skazal pokojnik, 2000)
1973 Lesio
1974 Wszystko czerwone (All in Red)
adapted into the Russian television series Пан или пропал (Pan ili propal, 1998)
1975 Romans wszechczasów (The Romance of the Century)
1976 Boczne Drogi (Country Roads)
1977 Upiorny legat (A Ghastly Legacy)
adapted into the feature film Skradziona kolekcja (1979), directed by Jan Batory
1979 Studnie przodków (The Forefathers' Wells)
1983 Duch (Ghost)
1990 Szajka bez końca (The Endless Gang)
1990 Ślepe szczęście (Blind Fortune)
1990 Dzikie białko (Wild Protein)
1992 Wyścigi (The Horse Racing)
1993 Tajemnica (The Secret)
1993 Drugi wątek (Second Thread)
1993 Florencja, córka Diabła (Florence, Devil's daughter)
1993 Zbieg okoliczności (Coincidence)
1994 Jeden kierunek ruchu (One-Way Traffic)
1994 Pafnucy
1995 Lądowanie w Garwolinie (Landing in Garwolin)
1996 Duża polka (The Big Polka)
1996 Dwie głowy i jedna noga (Two heads and one leg)
1996 Wielki diament (The Diamond Story)
1996 Jak wytrzymać z mężczyzną (How to Cope with a Man)
1996 Jak wytrzymać ze współczesną kobietą (How to Cope with a Modern Woman)
1997 Krowa niebiańska (Holy Cow)
1997 Hazard (Risk)
1998 Harpie (Harpies)
1998 Złota mucha (The Golden Fly)
1999 Depozyt (The Deposit)
1999 Najstarsza prawnuczka (The Oldest Great Granddaughter)
2000 Przeklęta bariera (The Accursed Barrier)
2000 Książka poniekąd kucharska (A Sort of Cookery Book)
2001 Trudny trup (The Difficult Corpse)
2001 Jak wytrzymać ze sobą nawzajem (How to Cope with Each Other)
2002 (Nie)boszczyk mąż (The (In)animate Husband)
2002 Pech (Bad Luck)
2003 Babski motyw (Women's theme)
2003 Bułgarski bloczek
2004 Kocie worki (A Pig in a Poke)
2005 Mnie zabić (To Kill Myself)
2005 Zapalniczka (The Zipper)
2006 Krętka blada (Pale Spirochete)
2007 Rzeź bezkręgowców (Slaughter of Invertebrates)

Children's and young adult fiction
1974 Zwyczajne życie (An Ordinary Life)
1976 Większy kawałek świata (Bigger part of the World)
1979 Nawiedzony dom (Haunted House)
1981 Wielkie zasługi (Great merit)
1988 Skarby (Treasures)
1991 2/3 sukcesu (2/3 of Success)
1992 Ślepe szczęście (Blind Luck)
1993 Wszelki wypadek (Every Case)
1994 Pafnucy (Pafnucy)
2003 Las Pafnucego (Pafnucy's Forest)

Non-fiction
1994 Jeden kierunek ruchu (One-Way Traffic)
1994 Autobiografia (Autobiography)
1996 Jak wytrzymać z mężczyzną (How to Cope with a Man)
1996 Jak wytrzymać ze współczesną kobietą (How to Cope with a Modern Woman)
1997 Hazard (Risk)
2000 Książka poniekąd kucharska (A Sort of Cookery Book)
2001 Jak wytrzymać ze sobą nawzajem (How to Cope with Each Other)
2005 Przeciwko babom! (Against Hags!)
2006 Autobiografia, tom 6 — Stare próchno (Autobiography - Old Rotten)
2007 Traktat o odchudzaniu (The Treaty on Weight Loss)
2008 Autobiografia, tom 7 — Okropności (Autobiography - Horrors)

References

External links
Official site
Culture.pl: Joanna Chmielewska
Chmielewska Joanna at the Instytut Książki (Book Institute, Polish Ministry of Culture)

Fan site

1932 births
2013 deaths
20th-century Polish women writers
21st-century Polish women writers
20th-century Polish novelists
21st-century Polish novelists
Polish mystery writers
Polish crime fiction writers
Polish designers
Warsaw University of Technology alumni
Polish women novelists
Women crime writers